The Old Harbor Housing Project, later renamed the Mary Ellen McCormack Project, is a 27-acre housing project opposite Joe Moakley Park in South Boston, Massachusetts.

History
Built in 1936 by the Federal Public Works Administration (PWA) as one of 50 slum clearance and low income housing projects being constructed nationwide. Construction cost $6,000,000, and opened on May 1, 1938. The Old Harbor Village was the first public housing development in New England and it remains one of the largest. It comprises more than 1,000 apartments in 22 three-story buildings and 152 row houses. The complex was renamed after the mother of John W. McCormack, former Speaker of the United States House of Representatives, who championed housing and human rights.

The Project is best known for being the housing project where James "Whitey" Bulger grew up, and a neighborhood "where court-ordered desegregation of schools through busing led to hostility and violence in the 1970s". The housing project itself was under a HUD approved desegregation plan.

As of 2017, the complex has 1,016 subsidized apartments located a short distance from the Red Line rapid transit line and various bus routes.

Renovation proposal
In August 2017, the Boston Housing Authority announced a partnership with WinnCompanies on a $1.6 billion redevelopment project that would replace the 1,016 subsidized apartments with 3,139 mixed-income units, adding middle-income/workforce housing and market-rate rental units and condominiums to the replacement subsidized units. The proposal also calls for the addition of community space, green space and retail locations, including a supermarket.

See also
 Desegregation busing in the United States
 Old Colony Housing Project

References

Further reading 
 Kerstein, Milton Lewis, Old Harbor Housing Project: A study of development of public housing policy, 1930-1938 (University of Massachusetts Boston. Theses. History - M.A), 1981
 Leland, Joseph D., Specification for construction of superstructure for Old Harbor Village, Project no. H-3302, Boston, Massachusetts, Federal Emergency Administration of Public Works, Housing Division (1936)
 "Boston's First Public Housing Development: The Mary Ellen McCormack", LP REEL NEWS, Volume Four, Spring 2003, Lamont Productions, Inc., Washington, D.C.

Public housing in Boston